The Zira FK 2020-21 season was Zira's sixth Azerbaijan Premier League season, and seventh season in their history.

Season events
On 17 July, Rashad Sadygov was announced as Zira's new manager on a three-year contract.

On 1 August, Hajiagha Hajili joined Zira on loan from Qarabağ for the season.

On 17 August, Zira announced the signing of Caio Rangel from Ferroviária to a one-year contract, with the option of a second year.

On 1 September, Zira announced the signing of Matheus Albino from Londrina to a two-year contract.

On 5 September, Dimitrios Chantakias signed a one-year contract with Zira.

On 17 September, Gheorghe Anton was released by Zira.

On 5 October, Zira signed Gismat Aliyev from Gabala.

On 26 October, Zira announced the signing of Richard Almeida on a contract until the end of the season.

On 16 December, Caio Rangel left Zira by mutual consent, with Rashad Eyyubov also leaving the club by mutual consent on 21 December.

On 2 January, Musa Gurbanli moved to Zira on loan for the rest of the season from Qarabağ.

On 19 January, Zira announced the signing of Nemanja Andjelkovic on a 2.5-year contract.

On 29 January, Zira announced the departure of Alie Sesay by mutual consent, with Filipe Pachtmann joining the next day on loan from Lviv until the end of the season, with an option to make the move permanent on a three-year contract at the end of the season.

On 6 March, Zira announced the signing of Rodrigue Bongongui from Hapoel Hadera, with Facundo Melivilo signing from San Martín the following day.

Squad

Transfers

In

Loans in

Out

Released

Friendlies

Competitions

Premier League

Results summary

Results by round

Results

League table

Azerbaijan Cup

Squad statistics

Appearances and goals

|-
|colspan="14"|Players away from Zira on loan:
|-
|colspan="14"|Players who left Zira during the season:

|}

Goal scorers

Clean sheets

Disciplinary record

References

Azerbaijani football clubs 2020–21 season
Zira FK